Macomb Correctional Facility (MRF) is a Michigan prison, located in Lenox Township, for adult male prisoners.

Facility
It has seven housing units currently used for Michigan Department of Corrections male prisoners 18 years of age and older. One of the housing units is used for Level I (lower level security) prisoners, four housing units for Level II prisoners, and two housing units for Level IV (higher level security) prisoners. Four other buildings provide for education, support services, storage, and prison administration.

Security
The facility is surrounded by three  chain link fences with razor-ribbon wire. Electronic detection systems and patrol vehicles are also utilized to maintain perimeter security. Two gun towers were added in 1997. In 2019, press reports indicated the towers are manned only intermittently.

Services
The facility offers education programs and community volunteer programs. Onsite medical and dental care is supplemented by local community providers and the Duane L. Waters Hospital in Jackson, Michigan.

See also

 List of Michigan state prisons

References

External links
 
 Michigan Department of Corrections

Prisons in Michigan
Buildings and structures in Macomb County, Michigan
1993 establishments in Michigan